Sterling is an unincorporated, census-designated place in northwestern Milton Township, Wayne County, Ohio, United States with the ZIP code of 44276.

History
Sterling was platted in 1880.

References

Unincorporated communities in Ohio
Unincorporated communities in Wayne County, Ohio